Bacon and cabbage is a dish traditionally associated with Ireland. The dish consists of sliced back bacon boiled with cabbage and potatoes. Smoked bacon is sometimes used.

The dish is served with the bacon sliced, and with some of the boiling juices added. Another common accompaniment to the dish is white sauce, which consists of flour, butter and milk, sometimes with a flavouring of some sort (often parsley).

Bacon use
The bacon used for the meal can vary somewhat depending on individual preference. Usually a brined "shoulder butt"/"picnic shoulder" is used for the recipe, but other cuts of bacon are sometimes preferred. However, the bacon used is almost always cured. The traditional curing process is a long process which involves storing the bacon in salt, however, in modern times, mass-produced bacon is cured using brine which is less frequently injected into the meat to speed-up the process. The bacon can also be smoked which adds a depth of flavour which some people prefer. In Ireland, one can also purchase what is known as home-cured or hard-cured which is bacon cured over a long period and then stored for another long spell, wrapped in paper. This makes the bacon very salty, hard in texture and yellowish in colour.

History 
Historically, this dish was common fare in Irish homes because the ingredients were readily available as many families grew their own vegetables and reared their own pigs.  It was considered nourishing and satisfying. The dish continues to be a very common meal in Ireland.

Descendants

Corned beef and cabbage
In the mid-to-late 19th century, Irish immigrants to the United States began substituting corned beef for bacon when making the dish, thereby creating corned beef and cabbage. Like the original, the dish sometimes includes additional vegetables (especially carrots and potatoes); this also gives it a certain similarity to the New England boiled dinner, which almost invariably contains a mixture of root vegetables along with boiled meat and cabbage.

The term "corned" comes from the large grains of salt used to cure beef, which was historically called "corns" of salt.

Corned beef and cabbage remains a popular food in some areas of the United States, and is often the dish of choice on St. Patrick's Day.

Jiggs dinner

On the island of Newfoundland, where the Irish and the English made up a large proportion of the founding settlers, this, and the similar English boiled beef gave rise to a boiled dinner featuring salted beef called Jiggs dinner.

See also 
 List of cabbage dishes
 List of Irish dishes
 Cassoeula
 Stegt flæsk

References

Irish cuisine
Bacon dishes
Cabbage dishes
Food combinations
Saint Patrick's Day food
Irish meat dishes